Welsh Open may refer to:

Welsh Open (darts)
Welsh Open (snooker)
Wales Open - golf tournament held at the Celtic Manor Resort, Newport